Sonia Olivia Williams (born May 28, 1979 in St. Johns) is a female track and field sprint athlete who competes internationally for Antigua and Barbuda.

Williams represented Antigua and Barbuda at the 2008 Summer Olympics in Beijing. She competed at the 100 metres sprint and placed sixth in her heat without advancing to the second round. She ran the distance in a time of 12.04 seconds.

International competitions

References

External links

Picture of Sonia Williams

1979 births
Living people
Antigua and Barbuda female sprinters
Olympic athletes of Antigua and Barbuda
Athletes (track and field) at the 1996 Summer Olympics
Athletes (track and field) at the 2008 Summer Olympics
Pan American Games competitors for Antigua and Barbuda
Athletes (track and field) at the 2007 Pan American Games
Commonwealth Games competitors for Antigua and Barbuda
Athletes (track and field) at the 1998 Commonwealth Games
Athletes (track and field) at the 2006 Commonwealth Games
Junior college women's track and field athletes in the United States
People from St. John's, Antigua and Barbuda
Olympic female sprinters